Nguyễn Anh Dũng (born 17 March 1976) is a Vietnamese chess player and FIDE Grandmaster.

His achievements include making it to the second round of the FIDE World Chess Championship 2002, and winning a team gold medal for Rapid chess at the Southeast Asian Games 2005.

Private life
He's been married to Lê Thị Phương Liên, a Vietnamese FIDE Woman Master. Their daughter, Nguyễn Lê Cẩm Hiền, has won 2015 World Junior Championship in U8 girl section.

References

External links
 

1976 births
Living people
Vietnamese chess players
Chess grandmasters
Place of birth missing (living people)
Asian Games competitors for Vietnam
Chess players at the 2006 Asian Games
Southeast Asian Games gold medalists for Vietnam
Southeast Asian Games medalists in chess
Competitors at the 2005 Southeast Asian Games